The Yingfeng Riverside Park is a park along the Keelung River in Zhongshan District and Songshan District of Taipei, Taiwan.

History
The park was completed in 2002.

Geography
The park covers an area of 60 hectares.

Facilities

The park features facilities for skating, softball, football, baseball, wood ball and miniature golf. The park also features Taiwan's first leash-free sports park for dogs, which measures approximately 1 hectare in area and contains two parts, one for big canines and the other for smaller ones. It includes dog-waste removers, eight benches and four wash basins.

Transportation
The park is accessible within walking distance south of Dazhi Station of Taipei Metro.

See also
 List of parks in Taiwan
 Guanshan Riverside Park

References

External link

2002 establishments in Taiwan
Dog parks
Parks established in 2002
Parks in Taipei